Zaharije Trnavčević (2 January 1926 – 13 January 2016) was a Serbian journalist and politician.
He was the president of the political party Rich Serbia. In the 2012 Serbian parliamentary election he was elected as a member of parliament, and as the oldest member became acting President of the National Assembly of Serbia.

Trnavčević died on 13 January 2016 in Belgrade, aged 90.

References

1926 births
2016 deaths
Serbian journalists
Writers from Šabac
20th-century Serbian people
Politicians from Šabac